The Yazidids were an Arab family what came to rule over the region of Shirvan (in Azerbaijan) in the mid 9th century. From Haytham ibn Khalid's assumption of the ancient Iranian title of Shirvanshah in 861, they practically broke free of Abbasid control and ruled Shirvan more or less independently until the 14th century.

Branches
They are sometimes called Mazyadids after their ancestor Mazyad al-Shaybani and also Shaybanids after their original tribe of Shayban. The name Yazidids comes from Mazyad's son Yazid.

Mazyadid dynasty was first generation of whole independent Shirvanshahs. Dynasty ruled both Shirvan and Layzan, until latter invaded Shamakhy and united crowns. The dynasty was a vassal and tributary state to Sallarids, Sajids and others. The Mazyadid reign is largely unexplored due to lack of sources. Sometimes numismatic evidences are the only sources about reign and existence of shahs.

Family tree
Descent from Mazyad, rulers shown in bold.

Aftermath
The Mazyadids were succeeded by Kasranids which is regarded as the start of the cultural Persianization of Shirvan.

References

Sources 
 
 
 
 
 
 
 

Medieval Azerbaijan
Arab dynasties
Banu Shayban
Shirvanshahs